Satish Kumar Gupta (born 20 April 1953) is an Indian immunologist and an Emeritus Scientist at the National Institute of Immunology. Known for his research in reproductive immunology, Gupta is an elected fellow of all the three Indian science academies viz. Indian Academy of Sciences, National Academy of Sciences, India and Indian National Science Academy He is also a J. C. Bose Fellow of the Department of Biotechnology and an elected fellow of the National Academy of Medical Sciences. The Council of Scientific and Industrial Research, the apex agency of the Government of India for scientific research, awarded him the Shanti Swarup Bhatnagar Prize for Science and Technology, one of the highest Indian science awards for his contributions to Medical Sciences in 1997.

Biography 

Born on 20 April 1953 at Chhachhrauli in the Indian state of Haryana to Gur Prasad Gupta and Satya Rani, S. K. Gupta did his early college studies at the University of Delhi from where he earned his graduate degree (BSc). Moving to the All India Institute of Medical Sciences, Delhi, he completed his master's degree and started his career as a research officer at National Institute of Immunology, India which had only been established the previous year. During this period, he pursued his doctoral studies simultaneously at AIIMS and secured a PhD in 1983. At NII, he held various posts including that of the head of Gamete Antigen Laboratory and after superannuation, he serves as an emeritus scientist at the institution. In between, he served as a visiting faculty at several institutions abroad; Johns Hopkins University, Pasteur Institute, Laboratory of Molecular Biology, Wayne State University, Centers for Disease Control and Prevention and Hyogo College of Medicine featuring among them. He has also served as the principal investigator in a number of projects undertaken by the National Institute of Immunology.

Gupta is married to Rita and the couple has two sons,  Ashish (married to Nidhi, blessed with 2 sons named Tanish and Aadish) and Manish (married to Ankita, blessed with a daughter named Anaisha. The family lives in Gurgaon.

Career 
Gupta's research covered the field of reproductive biology and he is known to have made studies on the effect of human hormones viz. Human chorionic gonadotropin and Gonadotropin-releasing hormone on reproductive functions. The team led by him has carried out elaborate investigations on Zona pellucida, a layer of glycoprotein enveloping the plasma membrane of mammalian oocytes and these studies have assisted in the efforts to develop immunocontraceptive protocols. Along with Gursaran Talwar, he pioneered Hybridoma technology in India and has designed diagnostic kits for HIV-1 and HIV-2 infections, Group A streptococcal infection and pregnancy detection. His research has been documented by way of several articles and his work has drawn many citations. Besides, he has published two texts on Immunology titled Reproductive Immunology and Immunology: Perspectives in Reproduction and Infection.

Gupta sat in the Scientific Advisory Committee of the Indian Council of Medical Research in 2005 and headed the Expert Group on Reproductive Health and Biologyof the Department of Biotechnology in 2013. He is a trustee of the Immunology Foundation, a member of the Indian Immunology Society and has been a member of the International Society for Immunology of Reproduction (1998–2004). His associations with international medical conferences include the VII International Congress of Reproductive Immunology held in New Delhi in October 1998 where he served as the convenor. He is a former member of the editorial boards of Reproductive Biomedicine Online, Journal of Reproductive Immunology and Reproductive Biology and Endocrinology and sits in the editorial boards of Indian Journal of Experimental Biology and Indian Journal of Medical Research.

Awards and honors 
Gupta received the Young Scientists Medal of the Indian National Science Academy in 1982 and the Shakuntala Amir Chand Prize of the Indian Council of Medical Research in 1984. A decade later, he received the 1994 VASVIK Industrial Research Award. The Council of Scientific and Industrial Research awarded him Shanti Swarup Bhatnagar Prize, one of the highest Indian science awards in 1997. He is also a recipient of the Population Control and Family Planning Award of Labhsetwar Foundation and the 2011 Ranbaxy Research Award. The National Academy of Medical Sciences elected him as a fellow in 1994 followed by the Indian Academy of Sciences in 1997. He became a fellow of the Indian National Science Academy in 2001 and the National Academy of Medical Sciences followed suit in 2005. The Award orations delivered by him include Smt. Swaran Kanta Dingley Oration of the Indian Council of Medical Research (1995) and Dr. Nitya Anand Endowment Lecture of Indian National Science Academy (2003). He also held the Tata Innovation Fellowship and the J. C. Bose Fellowship of the Department of Biotechnology during various tenures.

Selected bibliography

Notes

References

External links 
 
 

Scientists from Haryana
Indian medical writers
1953 births
Living people
Delhi University alumni
All India Institute of Medical Sciences, New Delhi alumni
Johns Hopkins University faculty
Pasteur Institute
Wayne State University faculty
Recipients of the Shanti Swarup Bhatnagar Award in Medical Science
Fellows of the Indian Academy of Sciences
Fellows of the Indian National Science Academy
Fellows of The National Academy of Sciences, India
Fellows of the National Academy of Medical Sciences
Indian immunologists